= Attentional concentration test =

The attentional concentration test (ACT) is a test for attentional concentration and also for intelligence. In the test, the person is repeatedly shown a bar of squares. There may be a colour bar such as for example underneath

a dice bar such as for example underneath

or a dice bar where the number of eyes is always two such as for example underneath

Every time the person is shown a bar, the person has to click on certain squares. In the default version of the test there is a colour bar in which three red colours occur each time. With this version it is intended that the person clicks on the red colours. This must be done as quickly as possible, but no errors may be made. There are three types of errors:

- A non-red color is clicked.
- A red color is not clicked.
- The order of clicks is not from left to right.

If an error is made, the test must be done all over again. The person can click on a button under the bar to get a new bar. In the standard version of the test, the number of bars that is offered is equal to 25. Every time the person clicks the button for a new bar, the time that has elapsed since clicking the button for the previous bar is recorded. Clicking the button for the second new bar records the time that has elapsed since clicking the start button. At the end of the test the person will see a graph with the sequence of successive times (bar response times). The person may practice the test indefinitely prior to the actual test administration. Practicing is even desirable because the relevant parameters can then be measured more accurately. During the actual test administration, the person may take the test multiple times and count the best result. The best result is the test administration, with the longest reaction time being the shortest compared to the other test administrations.

The test is based on inhibition theory. In inhibition theory it is assumed that always when you are focusing on something there are constantly alternating short periods of attention (really busy thinking) and distraction (not being focused). During a period of attention something like inhibition (i.e. inhibition to continue) rises and the rise is linear (linear) with a slope a_{1} and during distraction periods the inhibition decreases and also the decrease is linear with slope a_{0}. This process of increasing and decreasing inhibition can be described as a random oscillator.

A detailed description of the test is given in van der Ven, Hotulainen, & Thuneberg (2017). Among other things, it has been scientifically demonstrated that the test is related to scientific reasoning (Hotulainen, Thuneberg, Hautamki, & Vainikainen, 2014).
